Austin Levy Wahrhaftig (May 5, 1917 – November 11, 1997) was an American chemist and mass spectrometrist known for his development of the quasi-equilibrium theory of fragmentation of molecular ions. The Wahrhaftig diagram that illustrates the relationship between internal energy and unimolecular ion decomposition is named after him.

Early life and education
Wahrhaftig was born in Sacramento, California, where he attended grade school, high school, and two years at Sacramento Junior College. He attended the University of California, Berkeley where he did undergraduate research with Joel Hildebrand and received an A.B. in chemistry in 1938.

He went to graduate school at  the California Institute of Technology where he worked under Richard M. Badger and Verner Schomaker . He received his Ph.D. in 1941. He was a research fellow at Caltech from 1941 to 1945.

He then worked at the Wright Air Development Center in Pasadena, California, and as a University Fellow at the Ohio State University with Herrick L. Johnston.

Academic career
Wahrhaftig joined the faculty at the Chemistry Department at the University of Utah in 1947 where he rose through the ranks and spent the rest of his career. He retired to become an emeritus professor in 1987.

References

Further reading

1917 births
1997 deaths
20th-century American chemists
Mass spectrometrists
University of California, Berkeley alumni
California Institute of Technology alumni
California Institute of Technology fellows
University of Utah faculty